The 1945–46 Indiana Hoosiers men's basketball team represented Indiana University. Their head coach was Harry Good, who was in his 3rd and final year as Branch McCracken returned from World War II in time for the following season. The team played its home games in The Fieldhouse in Bloomington, Indiana, and was a member of the Big Nine Conference.

The Hoosiers finished the regular season with an overall record of 18–3 and a conference record of 9–3, finishing 2nd in the Big Nine Conference. Indiana was not invited to participate in any postseason tournament.

Roster

Schedule/Results

|-
!colspan=8| Regular Season
|-

References

Indiana Hoosiers
Indiana Hoosiers men's basketball seasons
1945 in sports in Indiana
1946 in sports in Indiana